William Horgan (17 May 1944 – 29 May 2015) was an Irish hurler, Gaelic footballer and referee. At club level he played with Brian Dillons and later served as a referee at club and inter-county levels.

Career

Horgan played hurling and Gaelic football with the Brian Dillons club and was a member of the team that won City JHC titles in 1965 and 1968. He later served as club secretary and was heavily involved in the underage and juvenile section of the club, particularly in running the local street leagues. In retirement from playing, Horgan began his refereeing career in 1974. He began officiating at a number of club games in the Cork SHC before joining the inter-county refereeing scene at minor and under-21 levels. Horgan took charge of his first National League games in 1977 while he also officiated in Railway Cup and All-Ireland SCHC games. Horgan was the referee for the 1991 All-Ireland SHC final between Kilkenny and Tipperary. He retired from inter-county activity in 1995.

Personal life and death

Horgan's father, also Willie, was on the Cork junior hurling team beaten by London in the 1938 All-Ireland junior final. He was married to Peggy Dorgan who won an All-Ireland medal with the Cork senior camogie team in 1970. Horgan died on 29 May 2015, aged 71.

Honours

Brian Dillons
City Junior A Hurling Championship: 1965, 1968

References

1944 births
2015 deaths
Brian Dillon's hurlers
Hurling referees